World UFO Day is an awareness day for people to gather together and watch the skies for unidentified flying objects (UFO). The day is celebrated by some on June 24, and others on July 2. June 24 is the date that reporter Kenneth Arnold wrote is generally considered to be the first widely reported UFO in the United States, while July 2  the supposed UFO crash in the 1947 Roswell incident. July 2 was declared as the official World UFO Day by the World UFO Day Organisation.It is believed that the first World UFO Day was celebrated in 2001 by UFO researcher Haktan Akdogan.

The stated goal of the July 2 celebration is to raise awareness of "the undoubted existence of UFOs" and to encourage governments to declassify their files on UFO sightings.

World UFO Day is celebrated by stirring conversations about how and why humans are not the only beings in the Universe. The WUFDO (World UFO Day Organisation)promotes various events and educational workshops with the idea of getting people to know about UFOS.

See also 
 World Contact Day

References

External links 
 Flying Saucer Day / World UFO Day  celebrated on July 2
 World UFO Day, celebrated on July 2
 Ovni.net World UFO Day, celebrated on June 24

UFO culture
UFO day
June observances
July observances